"Murder at the Mansion" was the fifth story arc from Grant Morrison's run on the Marvel Comics title New X-Men, running from issues #139-141. It features the origin of Emma Frost, revealing her background and back story.

Plot

After finding her husband in a "mental" sexual relationship with Emma Frost, Jean thrusts Cyclops out of the shared mindscape in order to confront Emma over the affair. Using the power of the Phoenix, Jean forces her way past Emma's psychic defenses as she makes Emma relive her past in order to humiliate Emma in her quest for the truth about the extent of her affair with Cyclops. Jean forces Emma to reveal her past: the youngest of four children, a rather plain looking Emma was neglected by her sadistic father and pill-popping mother. It is revealed that the only moment in which her father showed any interest in her was shortly after her 18th birthday, when he revealed that he planned on making Emma his heir as far as leaving her control over his vast corporate empire, Frost Industry. Emma refused, out of spite for the way in which her father had treated her as an afterthought her entire life. With her mental powers, Emma decided that she would make her own way and used her telepathic powers to gain entrance into the Hellfire Club, landing a job as an exotic dancer at one of the club's gentlemen's club. She soon attracted attention from Sebastian Shaw, who paid for plastic surgery (including a nose job) and molded her into his idealized "White Queen". She then demands to know what happened in China during the events of New X-Men Annual 2001, when Cyclops appears and tells Jean to scan his mind. Learning that Cyclops turned down Emma's sexual advances that night, Jean still remains bitter towards Scott over the telepathic affair, which she considers to be adultery even if there was no actual sex involved. Disgraced, Cyclops flees the Mansion as Wolverine consoles Emma. Emma reveals that despite Jean's proclamations that Emma only seduced her husband for the sake of causing malice for the sake of malice, Emma confides to Logan that she does indeed love Cyclops.

Shortly afterwards, Emma is confronted by Angel, who shoots Emma in the face (the nose to be specific, as it is her weak spot in her diamond form). Before the bullet is fired, Emma realizes that Angel is being controlled by one of her students, the telepath Esme of the Stepford Cuckoos. Esme had been dealing the mutant drug Kick on campus and wanted to kill Emma, who had been investigating the drug's presence on campus in the prior arc, "Riot at Xavier's".

Bishop and Sage are called in to investigate, locking down the campus to examine the scene and question all suspects. Interviewing "Red Neck", a member of Quintin Quire's gang in prison after the riot, Bishop learns where on campus that Quentin went to in order to meet up with Esme, who sold him the drug. Sage examines the area, finding a cottage, with odd, egg-like organisms hanging from the ceiling only to be attacked by Toad (who is lurking in the shadows).

The eggs belong to Angel and Beak; having gotten Angel pregnant and fearful that they would be kicked off campus, Beak falsely confesses to having dealt the Kick and the murder of Emma in hopes of protecting Angel, who informed him of what she did and how she has no proof that she was used as a remote controlled assassin.

As Bishop finds the murder weapon in the shack when Sage wakes up, Professor Xavier begins to piece together the facts of the incident even as Jean Grey realizes that Emma is still alive. Restoring her body with help from the Phoenix Force, Emma proclaims Esme as her attacker as Bishop and Sage confront the teenage telepath as she tries to leave the school. They try and stop her and ask why she did it, at which point Esme reveals that she blames Emma for inspiring Sophie to stop the riot, dying in the process. Esme then telepathically knocks them unconscious as Xorn (really Magneto in disguise) from afar magnetically causes the taxi that Esme is fleeing in to move far away from the mansion.

In the end, the X-Men are introduced to Angel and Beak's children as they are assured that they will be allowed to stay on campus and not be expelled due for having sex. However, a more pressing issue is the location of Cyclops and who were Esme's allies, that helped her escape and attacked Sage.

Major consequences
Emma Frost's origin is revealed, though several details (like her motives for turning down her father's offer to run his company) are explored differently in the 18 issue Emma Frost ongoing series that was published in 2005. 
Angel and Beak's children are born. The two will remain with the school until after Planet X/Here Comes Tomorrow, where they would set up house in the cottage on campus grounds. 
Esme Cuckoo is revealed as a villain. Her accomplices would later be revealed to be Magneto (under the alias "Xorn") and Toad (who attacked Sage from the shadows). Esme is also revealed to be the campus supplier of the drug "Kick".
 The story arc would be the second and last time in which the Uncanny X-Men team would be featured in the pages of Morrison's run as Nightcrawler is seen in a crowd shot in New X-Men #140.

Collected editions
The series has been collected into a trade paperback along with the "Assault on Weapon Plus" storyline:

Assault on Weapon Plus (collects #139-145)

As well as:

New X-Men Omnibus (collects New X-Men #114-154 and Annual 2001, 992 pages, December 2006 )
 New X-Men by Grant Morrison Ultimate Collection: Volume 2 (collects New X-Men #127-141, 360 pages, August 2008)

References

New X-Men story arcs